'Eternal Lord' is a self-titled EP by the British deathcore band Eternal Lord. It contains 5 songs and was released by Thirty Days of Night Records.

This EP is now out of print and is considered a rarity due to its difficult nature to come across.

Track listing

 "Upon Thy Icy Waves"
 "Something Higher Awaits"
 "Fields and Failure"
 "Deeds to the Throne"
 "Winter Flesh Dance"

Lyrics by Samuel Ricketts
Music composed by Chris Gregory

Eternal Lord albums
2006 EPs